Vasudevan Peethambharan, known professionally as P Vasu, is an Indian director, writer and actor who works in Tamil, Telugu, Kannada, Hindi, and Malayalam language films. In a career spanning three decades, Vasu has directed over 64 films.

Early life and education 
P. Vasu's father, Peethambaran Nair, worked as a make-up man for N. T. Rama Rao and M. G. Ramachandran in their films during his time. He was one of the leading make-up artists during his period and was elected as the president of the make-up union Tamil Nadu for 30 years. He later went on to become a producer.

He produced about 25 films in Tamil and Telugu and became one of the leading producers in the south. He produced with his brother M. C. Sekhar, who was a cinematographer. M. C. Sekhar had worked as a cinematographer for more than 150 films. Peethambharan died on 21 February 2011 at the age of 89.

Vasu is an alumnus of Wesley High School, Chennai. Vasu is married to Shanthi and has a son, Sakthi Vasu, who is an actor and a daughter, Abhirami Vasudevan. His mother is Kamala. Vasu's brothers are Vidyasagar and Vimal, and his sisters are Vijaylakshmi, Vasantha and Vanaja. He is a Malayali from Nedumbal, a village in Thrissur district, Kerala, but settled in Tamil Nadu.

Career 
Vasu joined director C. V. Sridhar as an assistant. Vasu started his career with Santhana Bharathi as a co-director and made films such as Panneer Pushpangal (1981),  Madhu Malar (1981), Mella Pesungal (1983), Sahasame Jeevitham (1984) and Needhiyin Nizhal (1985). "We compromised on certain things as we had different approaches to the subject. That's the reason why some of our other movies failed to make a big impression in the box office, prompting us to take our own paths," he says.

During his career, films like Panakkaran (1990), Nadigan (1990), Chinna Thambi (1991), Mannan (1992), Walter Vetrivel (1993) and Sethupathi IPS (1994) have become blockbusters.

The director went through a career slump in the mid-1990s after a series of failures, through his high budget romantic musical Love Birds (1996). He has made films in all the four South Indian languages and he has worked with almost all top stars.

From the 2000s, Vasu also began as an actor. He usually portrays a supporting role or an antagonistic role. His directed films Apthamithra (2004) went on to cross the one-year mark, while legendary Chandramukhi (2005) has had a record run of 800 days and more. Elated with the grand success of his Kannada film Aptharakshaka (2010), which happens the last project of Vishnuvardhan. He completed remaking the film in Telugu titled Nagavalli (2010) (Chandramukhi 2), features Venkatesh in the lead role. Earlier P. Vasu had plans about remaking the film in Tamil with Superstar Rajinikanth titled Chandramukhi 2. However, the project didn't happen as the actor got busy with Shankar’s Enthiran (2010).

Soon after the grand success of Chandramukhi, P Vasu was initially supposed to sign Kamal Haasan for a film featuring him in triple action roles. However, Kamal Haasan couldn't take up the project as he already got committed to Dasavathaaram (2008), where he had to play 10 roles.

Vasu made a film called Thottal Poo Malarum (2007), with his son Shakthi. The young actor is not new to acting; he has acted as a child in his father's films.

In June 2013, P. Vasu revealed that he was set to direct an English film titled Curry in Love, with an apparent star cast of Sonam Kapoor, Anil Kapoor, Vijay, Eddie Murphy and Jon Voight. However, the supposed cast denied the reports as baseless and P. Vasu postponed the film, citing a delay in production. Later in April 2017, Vasu revealed that he still had intentions of making the film if he found a producer to help finance the project. Similarly in early 2014, P. Vasu released an official statement claiming that his next film would be an animatronics venture titled Aishwaryavum Aayiram Kaakkavum and that Aishwarya Rai would feature in the leading role. Aishwarya Rai's team later denied claims citing that such allegations of an agreement were premature.

Actor Raghava Lawrence have teamed up for the first time with the director in Shivalinga (2017) that too for the remake of Vasu's Kannada blockbuster Shivalinga (2016) as horror-comedy genre. Shivalinga is saved by its packaging as a commercial family entertainer and Vadivelu's comedy. Vasu is also his outing with Shiva Rajkumar in Ayushman Bhava (2019).

Style of working 
Vasu's films are usually in the masala genre, with melodrama as a key theme. Indiaglitz wrote: "Vasu ruled the early 90's with his sentimental tearjerkers, The joke in film circles was that Vasu came to the studios with a `thali' (mangalsutra) and a script. He started using sister-brother- mother- father sentiment". According to Behindwoods, "Vasu's style of storytelling has pervasive dramatization with a more-than-usual touch of sentiment".

Vasu learnt the finer nuances of direction from Sridhar, under whom he started off as an assistant director, and added that he never followed Sridhar's style of filmmaking and has always tried to be original. Vasu said that during childhood, "I found myself watching films and narrating the stories to my friends in school. If the school would begin at nine I would reach there by eight and narrate the story for an hour".

Accolades 
Vasu has won recognition for his work from the film fraternity and the state government. He won state awards for three years in a row from 1990, for Best Screenplay and Dialogues in Nadigan, in 1991 as Best Director in Chinna Thambi. He was awarded the Filmfare award for Best Direction for the movie Apthamitra. He also won the Tamil Nadu State Film Honorary Award – J. Jayalalithaa Award in 2002. He was awarded the Kalaimaamani Award in 2004, reminiscent of his father Shri M. Peethambaram who was an awardee for Best make-up.

Vasu is a member of the state award selection committee and jury member of the committee for tax-free movies.

Filmography

As director

As actor

As writer

As producer

As singer

References 

Male actors in Tamil cinema
Living people
Tamil Nadu State Film Awards winners
1954 births
Filmfare Awards South winners
Tamil film directors
Kannada film directors
Telugu film directors
Recipients of the Kalaimamani Award
Tamil screenwriters
Film directors from Chennai
Male actors from Chennai
Screenwriters from Chennai
21st-century Indian male actors
20th-century Indian dramatists and playwrights
20th-century Indian film directors
Tamil film producers
Male actors in Kannada cinema
Male actors in Malayalam cinema
Male actors in Telugu cinema
Indian male film actors
Malayalam screenwriters
Kannada screenwriters
Telugu screenwriters
21st-century Indian dramatists and playwrights
21st-century Indian film directors
Film producers from Chennai
Malayalam film producers